Belus Van Smawley (March 20, 1918 – April 24, 2003) was an American basketball player and coach.

A 6'1" guard/forward from Rutherford County, North Carolina, Smawley was one of the first basketball players to regularly use the jump shot. Smawley developed his shot in an abandoned train depot near his home that was fashioned into a basketball court. Basketball historian John Christgau has concluded that Smawley and Kenny Sailors of rural Wyoming were using jump shots as early as 1934.

Smawley was an All-American basketball player at Appalachian State University before becoming one of the early stars of the Basketball Association of America (which became the National Basketball Association in 1949.) From 1946 to 1952, Smawley competed for the St. Louis Bombers, Syracuse Nationals, and Baltimore Bullets, averaging 12.7 points per game. During the 1948–49 BAA season, Smawley ranked sixth in the league in total points and fourth in field goals made.

After his playing career ended, Smawley served as a school principal and basketball coach. Between 1951 and 1956, Smawley served as the Athletic Director and head men's basketball coach at Pembroke State College, known today as The University of North Carolina at Pembroke, in Pembroke, North Carolina. In December 1951, he took a three-month leave of absence from Pembroke State College to finish his playing career with the Baltimore Bullets. In his absence, Vernon Felton, a member of the Pembroke State faculty and former Appalachian State athlete, led the team to 12 wins and five losses; finishing the season at 12-10. Smawley was inducted into the North Carolina Sports Hall of Fame in 1992.

BAA/NBA career statistics

Regular season

Playoffs

Head coaching record

References

1918 births
2003 deaths
American men's basketball players
Appalachian State Mountaineers men's basketball coaches
Appalachian State Mountaineers men's basketball players
Baltimore Bullets (1944–1954) players
Basketball coaches from North Carolina
Basketball players from North Carolina
College men's basketball head coaches in the United States
People from Rutherford County, North Carolina
Player-coaches
Shooting guards
Small forwards
St. Louis Bombers (NBA) players
Syracuse Nationals players
UNC Pembroke Braves basketball coaches